The 2022 Lebanese Challenge Cup was the 9th edition of the Lebanese Challenge Cup. The competition included the teams placed between 7th and 10th in the 2021–22 Lebanese Premier League, and the two newly promoted teams from the 2021–22 Lebanese Second Division.

The first matchday was played on 28 July, one day after the start of the 2022 Lebanese Elite Cup. The final was played on 21 August, with Akhaa Ahli Aley beating their rivals Safa 1–0.

Group stage

Group A

Group B

Final stage

Semi-finals

Final

References

External links
 RSSSF

Lebanese Challenge Cup seasons
Challenge